Clarksville/Red River County Airport , also known as J. D. Trissell Field, is a public use airport located three nautical miles (6 km) southwest of the central business district of Clarksville, in Red River County, Texas, United States. It is owned by Clarksville and Red River County.

Although most U.S. airports use the same three-letter location identifier for the FAA and IATA, this airport is assigned LBR by the FAA but has no designation from the IATA (which assigned LBR to Lábrea Airport in Lábrea, Amazonas, Brazil).

Facilities and aircraft 
It has one runway designated 17/35 with an asphalt surface measuring 3,000 by 50 feet (914 x 15 m). For the 12-month period ending April 30, 2007, the airport had 3,300 general aviation aircraft operations, an average of 275 per month.

References

External links 
  page from Texas DOT Airport Directory
 Aerial image as of February 1995 from USGS The National Map

Airports in Texas
Buildings and structures in Red River County, Texas
Transportation in Red River County, Texas